Söderhöjdens BK was a sports club in Stockholm, Sweden. Established in 1971. it played three seasons in the Swedish women's bandy top division.

References

1971 establishments in Sweden
Defunct football clubs in Sweden
Defunct bandy clubs in Sweden
Sporting clubs in Stockholm
Association football clubs established in 1971
Bandy clubs established in 1971